A national second tier of Japanese league football was first established in 1972, as the Japan Soccer League Second Division. In 1992, with the breakup of the JSL and restructuring of the top flight into the J.League, the (former) Japan Football League became the second tier. In 1999 the J.League has established a second division (officially known as J2 League).

Japan Soccer League Second Division (1972–1992)
Numbers in parentheses indicate number of wins at the date.

† Not promoted to Division 1 due to losing promotion/relegation series‡ Not promoted to the newly formed J.League

(former) Japan Football League Division 1 (1992–1993)
An extra season of Japanese football was done by the Japan Football League in late 1992, as the top flight clubs were still re-organizing and adopting new identities before the J.League kicked off in 1993.

† Not promoted to J.League

(former) Japan Football League (1994–1998)
In 1994, the Japan Football League Division 2 was abolished. 

† Not promoted to J.League (J1 after 1998)

J2 League (1999–present)
From 1999 to 2014 the league was known as J.League Division 2.

† Not promoted to J1‡ Not promoted to J1 due to losing promotion/relegation seriesFor play-off winners, the number in parentheses indicates their position after the end of the season.

Total wins
Clubs in bold compete in J2 as of 2023 season. Clubs in italic no longer exist.Years in italic indicate seasons of amateur football (Japan Soccer League D2 and former Japan Football League).

See also
Japan Soccer League
Japan Football League (1992–1998)
J2 League
List of Japanese football champions
List of winners of J3 League and predecessors

Winners
Japan Soccer League
Japan Football League (1992–1998)
Japan